The Cat Walk is an album by American trumpeter Donald Byrd recorded in 1961 and released on the Blue Note label in 1962 as BLP 4075.

Reception
The Allmusic review by Steve Leggett awarded the album 4 stars and stated "Trumpeter Donald Byrd and baritone saxophonist Pepper Adams worked together on several recordings between 1958 and 1961, and The Cat Walk is among the best... Byrd's playing throughout is typically sleek and lyrical, and Adams' sturdy, husky baritone sound is the perfect counterbalance, making The Cat Walk an essential Byrd purchase".

Track listing
All compositions by Donald Byrd except as indicated

 "Say You're Mine" (Duke Pearson) - 7:21
 "Duke's Mixture" (Pearson) - 7:05
 "Each Time I Think of You" (Byrd, Pearson) - 5:39
 "The Cat Walk" - 6:46
 "Cute" (Neal Hefti) - 6:21
 "Hello Bright Sunflower" (Pearson) - 7:29

Personnel
Donald Byrd - trumpet
Pepper Adams - baritone saxophone
Duke Pearson - piano
Laymon Jackson - bass
Philly Joe Jones - drums

References

1962 albums
Albums recorded at Van Gelder Studio
Albums produced by Alfred Lion
Blue Note Records albums
Donald Byrd albums